Brij Mohan Shah (1933–1998), better known as B M Shah, was an Indian theatre director and playwright. Shah along with Mohan Upreti, are together credited for the revival of the theatre in the Uttarakhand. He was awarded the Sangeet Natak Akademi Award in 1979. #B_M_Shah

Biography
Brij Mohan Shah was born in 1933 in Nainital, he joined National School of Drama (NSD), New Delhi in 1960, and trained under, Ebrahim Alkazi, and later graduated in 1962. He also remained a Director at the school (1982–84). He is remembered for his plays, Tughlaq, Ghasiram Kotwal, Hayavadana, Do Kishitiyon Ke Sawar, and his most noted play was a playwright was the satirical play, 'Trishanku' (1967).

He also directed play for the Bhartendu Natya Academy (BNA) Lucknow and Shri Ram Centre for Performing Arts Repertory Company 

Shah was also a well regarded Sanskrit teacher at St. Columba's School, Delhi for several years, before he became Director, National School of Drama (New Delhi).
 
He also acted in two Hindi films, Yeh Woh Manzil To Nahin (1987) directed by Sudhir Mishra, followed by Dil Se.. (1998) by Mani Ratnam and a documentary film, The Post Master.

He died on 5 June 1998 in Lucknow.

Legacy
When he was Director of Bhartendu Natya Academy (BNA). Upon his death, 'B. M. Shah Award' was constituted by Uttar Pradesh Sangeet Natak Akademi, given each year to for outstanding contribution to the field of theatre . And BNA give name of own auditorium B. M. Shah Auditorium in Gomti Nagar in Lucknow.

Further reading
 Jaidev Taneja, B. M. Shah, 2004, .
 Dard Aya Tha Dabe Panv: J. N. Kaushal; (Ed. Kiran Bhatnagar); 2004, Bharatiya Jnanpith.

See also
 Music of Uttarakhand
 Theatre in India
 Kumaoni people

References

People from Nainital
Kumaon division
Indian male dramatists and playwrights
Indian theatre directors
Male actors from Uttarakhand
National School of Drama alumni
Academic staff of the National School of Drama
1933 births
1998 deaths
Recipients of the Sangeet Natak Akademi Award
Hindi dramatists and playwrights
Hindi theatre
Indian arts administrators
20th-century Indian dramatists and playwrights
20th-century Indian male actors
Dramatists and playwrights from Uttarakhand
20th-century Indian male writers